Ahlone Township (also Ahlone Township) is located in the western part of Yangon. The township comprises eleven wards, and shares borders with Sanchaung township and Kyimyindaing township in the north, the Yangon river in the west, Dagon township in the east, and Lanmadaw township in the south. 

Ahlone wharves administered by Myanmar Port Authority are located in southwestern Ahlone. Asia World has also operated a port in Ahlone since 2000. Thakin Mya Park is the major park in the township. This park was reconstructed in 2014 and before was an abandoned park for many years. Ahlone Township was once home to Thiri Mingala Market, Yangon's largest wholesale and retail market until 2010, when the Yangon City Development Committee began preparations to move the market to Hlaing Township in the suburbs, to allow for lane expansions on Strand Road and expansion of Asia World's wharves.

Population 
Ahlone Township has 55,482 residents residing as of March 2014. Majority of the residents are females being 53.9% of the population with males being 46.1%.

Education 
Ahlone has ten primary schools, two middle schools and six high schools.

Landmarks
The following are some high schools in Ahlone established over many decades.

References

Townships of Yangon